Gadoleic acid (20:1 n−11) is an unsaturated fatty acid.  It is a prominent component of some fish oils including cod liver oil. It is one of a number of eicosenoic acids. Its name is derived from a combination of the genus for cod (Gadus) and the Latin word oleum (oil), which itself is derived from the Ancient Greek ἔλαιον (elaion) meaning olive oil.

References

Fatty acids
Alkenoic acids